Elbeyi Guliyev (born 14 October 1995) is an Azerbaijani professional football player. He also holds Russian citizenship.

Club career

Ural Sverdlovsk Oblast
Guliyev was a product of the Ural Sverdlovsk Oblast youth system.

He made his professional debut for Ural on 19 March 2016 in a Russian Premier League 1–1 away draw against Terek, coming on as a substitute in the second half.

Loan to Zhetysu
On July 8, 2015, Guliyev was loaned to Kazakh side Zhetysu.

He scored his first competitive goal for Zhetysu on 31 October 2015, in a 2–1 home victory against Kaisar.

International career
He was called up Azerbaijan U21 on October, 2014 for training camp in Frankfurt and on March, 2015 for training camp in Baku.

References

External links
 
 

1995 births
Living people
Azerbaijani footballers
Azerbaijan under-21 international footballers
Sportspeople from Yekaterinburg
Azerbaijani expatriate footballers
Expatriate footballers in Kazakhstan
Kazakhstan Premier League players
FC Zhetysu players
Russian Premier League players
FC Ural Yekaterinburg players
Association football forwards
FC Irtysh Omsk players